

Oman
 Mombasa – Nasr ibn Abdallah al-Mazru‘i, Wali of Mombasa (1698–1728)

Portugal
 Angola – Henrique de Figueiredo e Alarcão, Governor of Angola (1717–1722)
 Macau – Antonio da Silva Telo e Meneses, Governor of Macau (1719–1722)

Colonial governors
Colonial governors
1721